Tinguipaya Municipality is the first municipal section of the Tomás Frías Province in the Potosí Department in Bolivia. Its seat is Tinguipaya.

Subdivision 
The municipality consists of the following cantons: 
Anthura, created 9 November 1992 
Tinguipaya, created 29 December 1949

Geography 
The municipality is located in the interadean zone with heights between 3,100 m and 4,882 m Malmisa being the highest elevation. Some of the highest mountains of the municipality are listed below:

The people 
The people are predominantly indigenous citizens of Quechua descent.

See also 
 Jatun Mayu

References

External links 
Tinguipaya Municipality: population data and map

Municipalities of Potosí Department